Streptomyces boninensis is a bacterium species from the genus Streptomyces which has been isolated from soil from a limestone cave from the Ogasawara Islands in Japan.

See also 
 List of Streptomyces species

References 

boninensis
Bacteria described in 2018